Darko Ostojić (born 23 March 1965), known by his nickname Ogi, is a Bosnian musician and actor. He first found mainstream success for his portrayal of Minka and Cane Prebranac in the TV Sarajevo series Top lista nadrealista. Also, he was a member of a Bosnian garage rock band Zabranjeno Pušenje during late 1980s. Other TV roles include Složna braća and the Nadreality Show.

Early life 
Ostojić is born in Sarajevo, SR Bosnia and Herzegovina, SFR Yugoslavia (nowadays Bosnia and Herzegovina) where he finished elementary school and a gymnasium. His father is Kamenko Ostojić, a Yugoslav violinist. His mother Laura was a project designer in the wood industry. His younger brother Dejan is a guitarist for Sarajevo-based rock bands Letu Štuke and Skroz.

Career 
In 1980, Ostojić and his friend Dado Džihan formed a rock band with a spiritual touch called Nirvana, later changed to Cyclone. A few years later, both of them joined garage rock band Zabranjeno Pušenje.

Ostojić joined Zabranjeno Pušenje in 1987. He performed on their two studio albums in the 1980s; Pozdrav iz zemlje Safari (1987) and Male priče o velikoj ljubavi (1989). In 1990, he parted ways with the band together with other members.

In 1988, Ostojić made his acting debut in the TV Sarajevo family television series Tragom ptice dodo directed by Timothy John Byford. In the next year, he starred in the second season of Top lista nadrealista.

Most recently, Ostojić has been playing a double bass for the Sarajevo Philharmonic Orchestra. He also performend in the orchestra from 1996 to 2002.

Discography 

Zabranjeno pušenje
 Pozdrav iz zemlje Safari (1987)
 Male priče o velikoj ljubavi (1989)

Filmography

References

External links
 Discography on Discogs
 

1965 births
Living people
Bosnia and Herzegovina guitarists
Bosnia and Herzegovina male guitarists
Bosnia and Herzegovina male television actors
Bosnia and Herzegovina rock musicians
Male actors from Sarajevo
Male double-bassists
Musicians from Sarajevo
Serbs of Bosnia and Herzegovina
Zabranjeno pušenje members
Yugoslav musicians
New Primitivism people
Top lista nadrealista